() most commonly refers to a "completed action", technique or practice within a yoga discipline meant to achieve a specific result.

Etymology
 is a Sanskrit term, derived from the Sanskrit root , meaning 'to do'.  means 'action, deed, effort'. The word karma is also derived from the Sanskrit root  , meaning 'to do, make, perform, accomplish, cause, effect, prepare, undertake'. Karma is related to the verbal Proto-Indo-European root  'to make, form'.

The root  is common in ancient Sanskrit literature, and it is relied upon to explain ideas in Rigveda, other Vedas, Upanishads, Puranas, and the Epics of Hinduism.

Practices

The yogic purifications or shatkarmas are sometimes called the Shatkriyas ("the six actions").

The Kriya Yoga school, established by Yogananda, is centered on pranayama techniques.

References